Alfredo M. Yao (born November 26, 1943) is a Filipino businessman who is the founder of Zest-O,Macay Holdings, Inc. and Philippine Business Bank. He served as the Special Envoy to China for Tourism and Cooperation in 2009.

Early life 
Yao was born on 26 November 1943. After losing his father at age 12, Yao began working to support his family since his mother's earnings as a sidewalk vendor could not support their needs. He attended the Mapua Institute of Technology but later dropped out due to financial problems.

Companies
 Zest-O Corporation
 Mazy's Capital, Inc.
 Macay Holdings, Inc.
 ARC Refreshments Corporation
 ARC Holdings, Inc.
 Philippine Business Bank

References

Sources
Investing businessweek
People Info: Alfredo Yao
Zesto Corporation official website
UACT official website
Zest-O ties up with Indon firm

External links
Zest-O Corporation
Macay Holdings, Inc.
Philippine Business Bank
AMY Foundation

Living people
1943 births
Filipino bankers
Businesspeople in the drink industry
Filipino billionaires
20th-century Filipino businesspeople
Filipino people of Chinese descent
Mapúa University alumni
Filipino company founders
21st-century Filipino businesspeople